Fine was a Sybille class 32-gun, copper-hulled, frigate of the French Navy.

Career
On 4 December 1778, Fine departed Brest under Lieutenant Saint-Félix, bound for the Cape of Good Hope and ultimately for Isle de France (Mauritius), carrying  ,.

Indian Ocean campaign of the American Revolutionary War 
On 16 April 1781, she was part of Suffren's squadron at the Battle of Porto Praya, although she did not take part in the action.  She took part in several actions in the Indian Ocean. In November 1781, Captain Périer de Salvert took command. Fine was part of the French frigate screen at the Battle of Providien, where she collided with  before unentangling herself, then ran aground, then caught fire, but managed to save herself. In June, Fine captured the 24-gun storeship Yarmouth, carrying rice, field artillery and nine Army officers. 

On 23 June, Fine captured the East Indianman Fortitude. When the French captured her they freed some eight men from Artésien, who had been part of the French prize crew at the Battle of Porto Praya. Fine brought Fortitude to Cuddalore, where Suffren's squadron was anchored, arriving there on 29 June. 

On 14 July 1782, following the Battle of Negapatam, Suffren appointed La Corne to Fine, replacing Salvert whom he had promoted to Flamand. On 28 July 1782, Fine joined Suffren's squadron at Bahour, where a diplomatic meeting with Hyder Ali was taking place. She was bringing as prize a British brig carrying a cargo of rice, as well as British colonel Horn, who was to take command of the Army of Thanjavur.  On 2 August 1782, Fine was at Tharangambadi with spare anchors for the squadron. 

On 8 August, as the squadron was sailing for the oncoming Battle of Trincomalee, Fine collided with Héros, snaping Héros bowsprit.

On 23 September 1782, L'Abbé de Saint-Georges took command of Fine.

In January 1783, Fine was under Chevalier de Saint-Georges. She intercepted the East Indiaman Bland-Fort but engaged from too far away and wasted her ammunition in a futile attempt to stop her. Three days after, Fine was thus unable to engage two other Indiamen when they passed nearby. Bland-Fort would be captured on 12 January by M. d'Herly, captaining Coventry, herself captured and recommissioned in the French Royal Navy that very day.

 Later career 
On 5 February 1791, under Augustin Truguet (1753-1793), she departed Brest, as part of a squadron bound for Martinique. 

In October 1793, she departed for France. 

Fate
Fine was wrecked in November 1793 in Chesapeake Bay. 

Notes, citations, and references NotesCitationsReferences'
 
 
 
 
 
 
 
 
 

Age of Sail frigates of France
Ships built in France
Sibylle-class frigates
1779 ships
Captured ships